Communauté d'agglomération du Grand Dax is the communauté d'agglomération, an intercommunal structure, centred on the town of Dax. It is located in the Landes department, in the Nouvelle-Aquitaine region, southwestern France. Created in 1993, its seat is in Dax. Its area is 344.3 km2. Its population was 55,657 in 2019, of which 20,843 in Dax proper.

Composition
The communauté d'agglomération consists of the following 20 communes:

Angoumé
Bénesse-lès-Dax
Candresse
Dax
Gourbera
Herm
Heugas
Mées
Narrosse
Oeyreluy
Rivière-Saas-et-Gourby
Saint-Pandelon
Saint-Paul-lès-Dax
Saint-Vincent-de-Paul
Saugnac-et-Cambran
Seyresse
Siest
Tercis-les-Bains
Téthieu
Yzosse

References

Dax
Dax